Mendon Township may refer to:

 Mendon Township, Adams County, Illinois
 Mendon Township, Clayton County, Iowa
 Mendon Township, Michigan
 Mendon Township, Chariton County, Missouri

See also
 Mendon (disambiguation)

Township name disambiguation pages